Impuls Flugdrachen GmbH, usually just called Impuls, was a German aircraft manufacturer that specialized in beginner and flight training hang gliders. The company was headquartered in Munich.

In February 2012 the company website carried an announcement that said: "Impuls Kites GmbH has stopped production of aircraft."

Aircraft

References

External links

Defunct aircraft manufacturers of Germany
Hang gliders